Cashua Street–Spring Street Historic District is a national historic district located at Darlington, Darlington County, South Carolina.  The district encompasses 39 contributing buildings in a residential section of Darlington. The district includes a significant collection of intact residences constructed between about 1890 and 1930. Many of the homes were owned by prominent Darlington citizens. The residences along Cashua Street are large, two-story frame dwellings while the residences along Spring Street are smaller, one-story frame houses. Most of the residences have decorative woodwork and are significant examples of the builder's art. Architectural styles include Victorian, Queen Anne, Colonial Revival, and Bungalow. The buildings are situated on large lots that are planted with trees and shrubs.

It was listed on the National Register of Historic Places in 1988.

References

External links
 

Historic districts on the National Register of Historic Places in South Carolina
Victorian architecture in South Carolina
Queen Anne architecture in South Carolina
Colonial Revival architecture in South Carolina
Historic districts in Darlington County, South Carolina
National Register of Historic Places in Darlington County, South Carolina
Darlington, South Carolina